Jacques van Wyk (born 27 January 1978) is a South African former cricketer. He played in 23 first-class and 31 List A matches for Boland from 1998 to 2009.

See also
 List of Boland representative cricketers

References

External links
 

1978 births
Living people
South African cricketers
Boland cricketers
People from Stellenbosch
Cricketers from the Western Cape